Larry Kramer (born June 23, 1958) is an American legal scholar and nonprofit executive. He is the current president of the William and Flora Hewlett Foundation and the former dean of Stanford Law School (2004–2012). He is a scholar of both constitutional law and civil procedure.

Biography

Education 
Kramer was born on June 23, 1958, in Chicago, Illinois to a Jewish family. He graduated magna cum laude and Phi Beta Kappa from Brown University in 1980 with an A.B. in psychology and religious studies. He graduated Order of the Coif and cum laude from the University of Chicago Law School in 1984.

Kramer clerked for Judge Henry Friendly of the U.S. Court of Appeals for the Second Circuit (1984–85) and U.S. Supreme Court Justice William J. Brennan Jr. (1985–86).

Academic career 
Kramer was an assistant professor at the University of Chicago Law School from 1986-1990 and a professor from 1990-1991. He then served as a visiting professor at the University of Michigan Law School from 1990-1991, and as a professor from 1991-1994. Kramer was a visiting professor at New York University Law School from 1993-1994, as well as at Harvard University Law School in 1997, and at Columbia University Law School in 2001. From 1994 to 2004, he was the Associate Dean for Research and Academics and the Russell D. Niles Professor at New York University Law School. From 2004-2012 he served as the Richard E. Lang Professor and Dean at Stanford Law School. Before joining Stanford, he served as a consultant for Mayer Brown.

During his tenure at Stanford, Kramer spearheaded significant reforms, including expanding joint degree programs as part of a multidisciplinary approach to legal studies. He enlarged the clinical education program and revamped programs to foster a public service ethos and built out the international law program to support a growing emphasis on globalization in legal practice. He was a significant supporter of the Afghanistan Legal Education Program, an initiative led by Stanford Law Students to develop innovative legal curricula to help Afghanistan's university train the next generation of lawyers and leaders.

Legal scholar 
Kramer has written and taught in such varied fields as constitutional law, conflict of laws, civil procedure, federal and its history, and the role of courts in society. He is the author of numerous books and articles, including The People Themselves: Popular Constitutionalism and Judicial Review, Reforming the Civil Justice System, Conflict of Laws: Cases-Comments-Questions, Judicial Supremacy and the End of Judicial Restraint, Madison's Audience, and Popular Constitutionalism.

Other 
Kramer serves on the board of directors of Equal Justice Works, a nonprofit organization that helps advance public interest law, and the ClimateWorks Foundation. Kramer is also an advisor to Ravel Law, a legal research start-up founded by two Stanford Law students while he was Dean.

Kramer put up a $500,000 for the bond of Samuel Bankman-Fried.

References

External links

1958 births
Living people
Brown University alumni
University of Chicago Law School alumni
American legal scholars
Conflict of laws scholars
Deans of Stanford Law School
Hewlett Foundation
Scholars of constitutional law
Stanford Law School faculty
University of Chicago Law School faculty
University of Michigan Law School faculty